Indrella is a monotypic genus containing the single species Indrella ampulla, a tropical terrestrial air-breathing gastropod mollusk in the family Ariophantidae. It is endemic to the Western Ghats of India.

I. ampulla is the only species in the genus Indrella, however the animal color is polymorphic: the visible soft parts of the snail can be various colors, including red and pale yellow.

Shell description 

The shell of this species is like that of Vitrina, imperforate, with few whorls and with a very large aperture. The shell consists mainly of proteins with only small amounts of calcium carbonate.

The shell is obliquely ovate and globose in shape and very thin. Half the thickness consists of epidermis, marked throughout with plicate line of growth, crossed by faint impressed spiral lines, and on the last whorl by shallow irregular furrows. The color of the shell is brownish olive, sometimes darker brown. Spire is small, convex and obtuse. The number of whorls is 3 and a half, rapidly increasing, the last much larger, rounded at the periphery and beneath. The aperture is very large, oblique, roundly oval, the same colour within as without, but smooth and glossy. The peristome is thin, membranaceous, columellar margin much curved inwards.

The width of the shell is 38–63 mm. The height is 30 mm. The width of the aperture is 32 mm and the height of aperture is 30 mm.

Anatomy 
The external soft parts are similar to those of Ariophanta, but larger, and not fully retractile within the shell. The mucous pore is of moderate size, there is no distinct overhanging lobe or a small one. The sole of the foot is undivided and very smooth. There are no shell-lobes. The dorsal lobes are well developed, the left divided into an anterior and a posterior part by a deep sinus. Kalc-sac small, receiving the vas deferens; retractor muscle attached to long straight caecum given off at the junction of the flagellum of the male organ. The spermatheca is oval, very short, on a short stem. The amatorial organ (the dart-sac) is stout and long.

Radula 
The jaw is straight, with a slight convexity on the cutting-edge and no median projection. The radula is broad, with about 100 rows of teeth: 145 .17 .1 .17 .145; median tooth and the 17 on each side (admedians) long, broadly pointed, straight-sided, lateral cusps indistinct; laterals curved, aculeate, outer laterals bicuspid.

Color of the soft parts 
"The animal, as represented in a drawing for which I am indebted to Sir Walter Elliot, is greenish yellow, but according to Col. Beddome it is black. It probably varies."

The color of soft parts has great color diversity, (color polymorphism) including white, cream, pale yellow, orange, red and black.

Distribution 
This species occurs in the Western Ghats of India, specifically on the wetter western slopes of the Wynaad, Nilgiri, and Anaimalai Hills, at moderate elevations (3000 ft).

Habitat 
This species lives in wet woodland, i.e. tropical rainforest.

Ecology 

I. ampulla is largely terrestrial seen on the forest floor occasionally see crossing the forest roads. Although it is a terrestrial snail also known to be partly arboreal. This species is reported to be submerged underwater for about 30 minutes while upper tentacles occasionally breaking the water surface
Colonel Richard Henry Beddome of the British Indian forest service found this snail feeding on large fungi.
Adventurer [Indrajith] of Gurugram found this snail crossing muddy way in search of fungi.

References 
The article incorporates public domain text from the reference.

External links 

Images:
 Photo of individual with pale yellow skin
 Pale yellow individual, contracted
 Two individuals, one red and one almost white
 Two orange individuals 
 two photos 

Ariophantidae
Gastropods described in 1850
Endemic fauna of the Western Ghats
Fauna of Kerala
Fauna of Tamil Nadu
Taxa named by William Henry Benson
Monotypic gastropod genera